The Omaha Trail is a 1942 American Western film directed by Edward Buzzell. It stars James Craig and Pamela Blake.

Cast
 James Craig as Pat Candel
 Pamela Blake as Julie Santley 
 Dean Jagger as Pipsestone Ross
 Edward Ellis as Mr. Vane 
 Chill Wills as Henry Hawkins
 Donald Meek as Engineer Jonah McCleod 
 Howard Da Silva as Ben Santley 
 Harry Morgan as Henchman Nat (as Henry Morgan) 
 Morris Ankrum as Henchman Job

Notes
According to MGM records the film earned $293,000 in the US and Canada and $130,000 elsewhere, making a loss of $161,000.

References

External links

1942 films
Films directed by Edward Buzzell
Films directed by Edward L. Cahn
Metro-Goldwyn-Mayer films
American black-and-white films
American Western (genre) films
1942 Western (genre) films
1940s English-language films
1940s American films